Boris Becker defeated Daniel Vacek 6–7(2–7), 6–4, 7–5 to win the 1995 Open 13 singles competition. Marc Rosset was the champion but did not defend his title.

Seeds

  Boris Becker (champion)
  Yevgeny Kafelnikov (quarterfinals)
  Slava Doseděl (second round)
  Olivier Delaître (semifinals)
  Fabrice Santoro (first round)
  Karol Kučera (quarterfinals)
  Daniel Vacek (final)
  Hendrik Dreekmann (first round)

Draw

Finals

Top half

Bottom half

References

External links
 Main Draw on ATP Archive

Singles
Open 13